Isopogon baxteri, commonly known as the Stirling Range coneflower, is a species of plant in the family Proteaceae and is endemic to the south-west of Western Australia. It is an erect shrub with wedge-shaped, often 3-lobed, toothed leaves and flattened spherical heads of hairy pink flowers.

Description
The flowers are arranged in sessile, flattened-spherical heads  in diameter with hairy, egg-shaped involucral bracts at the base.

Taxonomy
Isopogon baxteri was first formally described in 1830 by Robert Brown in the Supplementum to his Prodromus Florae Novae Hollandiae et Insulae Van Diemen from specimens collected in 1823 near the King George's Sound, by William Baxter.

Distribution and habitat
This isopogon grows in heath or shrubland in the Stirling Range and near Mount Barker in the south-west of Western Australia.

Conservation status
Isopogon baxteri is classified as "not threatened" by the Government of Western Australia Department of Parks and Wildlife.

References

baxteri
Eudicots of Western Australia
Plants described in 1830
Endemic flora of Western Australia
Taxa named by Robert Brown (botanist, born 1773)